Michael Locke may refer to:

Michael Locke (biologist) (1929–2013), English-born Canadian biologist
Michael Locke (stuntman) (born 1979), member of the Dirty Sanchez crew
Michael K. Locke (1952–2014),  American politician
Michael Lok (c.1532–c.1621), English merchant and traveller

See also
Michael Laucke (born 1947), Canadian guitarist